Jerzy is the Polish version of the masculine given name George. The most common nickname for Jerzy is Jurek, which may also be used as an official first name. Occasionally the nickname Jerzyk may be used, which means "swift" in Polish.

People

Jerzy, nom de guerre of Ryszard Białous, Polish World War II resistance fighter
 Jerzy Andrzejewski, Polish writer
 Jerzy Bartmiński, Polish linguist and ethnologist
 Jerzy Braun (disambiguation), several people
 Jerzy Brzęczek, Polish footballer and manager
 Jerzy Buzek, Polish politician and former Prime Minister
 Jerzy Dudek, Polish footballer
 Jerzy Fedorowicz, Polish actor and theatre director
 Jerzy Ficowski, Polish poet and translator
 Jerzy Grotowski, Polish theatre director and theorist
 Jerzy Hoffman, Polish film director, screenwriter, and producer
 Jerzy Jarniewicz, Polish poet, literary critic, translator and essayist
 Jerzy Janowicz, Polish tennis player
 Jerzy Jurka, Polish-American computational and molecular biologist
 Jerzy Kawalerowicz, Polish film director
 Jerzy Kosiński, Polish-American novelist
 Jerzy Kukuczka, Polish mountain climber
 Jerzy Kulej, Polish boxer and sports commentator
 Jerzy Owsiak, Polish social activist
 Jerzy Pilch, Polish novelist, journalist, and columnist
 Jerzy Połomski, Polish singer
 Jerzy Popiełuszko, Polish priest assassinated by the Security Service and beatified in the Catholic Church
 Jerzy Potz, Polish ice hockey player
 Jerzy Semkow, Polish conductor
 Jerzy Stuhr, Polish actor
 Jerzy Urban, Polish journalist and commentator
 Jerzy Vetulani, Polish neuroscientist
 Jerzy Waldorff, Polish media personality

See also 

Jerzy the Giant, the second album by "The Terrible Twos" 
Jurek (disambiguation)
Agnieszka Jerzyk

Polish masculine given names